Pteroodes longipennis is a moth in the subfamily Arctiinae first described by Francis Walker in 1854. It is found in Mexico.

References

Arctiini